The Dynali H3 EasyFlyer, now known as the Sport, is a Belgian helicopter designed and produced by the Dynali of the Thines district of Nivelles. The aircraft is supplied complete and ready-to-fly-aircraft or as a kit for amateur construction.

Design and development
The H3 was designed for the flight training, utility and personal-use roles. It features a single main rotor and tail rotor, a two-seats-in side-by-side configuration enclosed cockpit with a bubble canopy, skid landing gear and a four-cylinder, liquid and air-cooled, four stroke  Rotax 912ULS engine, a Dynali-developed fuel-injected  conversion Rotax 912ULS-1 engine or a  turbocharged Rotax 914 powerplant.

The aircraft fuselage frame is made from welded stainless steel tubing.

Specifications (H3)

See also
List of rotorcraft
Dynali H2S

References

External links

H3
2010s Belgian sport aircraft
2010s Belgian ultralight aircraft
2010s Belgian civil utility aircraft
2010s Belgian helicopters
Homebuilt aircraft
Single-engined piston helicopters